The Main Political Directorate of the Soviet Army and Soviet Navy (Glavnoe politicheskoe upravlenie Sovietskoy armii i Voenno-morskogo flota SSSR) was the central [military]-political organ of administration in the Soviet Armed Forces in 1919 through 1991 and controlled by the Communist Party of the Soviet Union.

The directorate was created at the 7th Congress of the Russian Communist Party (Bolsheviks) on the order of the Republic's Revolutionary Military Council No.674 of 18 April 1919 to implement political control in the Red Army and Fleet.


Names and leaders

Educational institutions

Military-political academy 
 Lenin Military-Political Academy (Moscow)

Military-political colleges (higher schools) 
 KGB Military-Political Border Service College (Golitsyno, Moscow Oblast)
 General Yepishev Military-Political College of Engineers and Signal troops (Donetsk)
 Kiev Naval Political College (Kiev)
 Kurgan Military-Political Aviation College (Kurgan, Kurgan Oblast)
 Komsomol 60th Anniversary MVD Political College (Leningrad)
 Andropov Military-Political College of Anti-Aircraft Defense (Leningrad)
 Military-Political College (Lviv)
 Military-Political Combined Arms College (Minsk)
 Great October 60th Anniversary Military-Political Combined Arms College (Novosibirsk)
 Marshal of the Soviet Union Biryuzov Military-Political College (Riga)
 Brezhnev Military-Political Tank-Artillery College (Sverdlovsk)
 Military-Political Construction College (Simferopol)
 Military-Political Construction College (Tallinn)
 Military-Political Faculty of the Marshal of Artillery Nedelin Command and Engineer College

See also
 Political commissar
 Commissar Order

References

Resources
 
 КПСС в резолюциях и решениях съездов, конференций и пленума ЦК, 7 изд., ч. 1. — М., 1954.
 КПСС о Вооружённых Силах Советского Союза. Документы 1917–1968. — М.: Воениздат, 1969.
 Мозговой С. А. «Не за страх, а за совесть…». К 100-летию создания Политорганов ВМФ // Морской сборник, 2019, No. 5. С. 38–41.
 Петров Ю. П. Строительство политорганов, партийных и комсомольских организаций Армии и Флота. — М.: Воениздат, 1968.

External links
 Historic reference
 GlavPUR. Handbook of the Workers'-Peasants' Red Army
 History of Political institutions in the Russian Army. Dossier (История военно-политических органов в российской армии. Досье). TASS. 30 July 2018.

Military of the Soviet Union
Communist Party of the Soviet Union
1919 establishments in Russia
1991 disestablishments in the Soviet Union